Jane & Abel is a Kenyan television series that premiered on 4 September 2015 at Maisha Magic East. It stars Lizz Njagah and Brian Ogola. Mumbi Maina stars as the antagonist. The soap opera takes lust, passion, greed, deceit and spite as the main thematic concerns.

Premise
Jane Kazi a competitive and highly independent woman and a 24/7 media group owner whose main mission is to get revenge on the Simba family, headed by the eldest son and CEO of Simba Media Empire, Abel Simba, who strives to keep the family business that dominates its market share. Jane is the illegitimate daughter of John Simba and step sister to Abel. She holds a deep resentment to the Simba family and does everything in her power to bring it down.

Cast
Lizz Njagah as Jane
Brian Ogola as Abel Simba
Sarah Hassan as Leah
Mumbi Maina as Cecelia 
Angel Waruinge as Aida Simba
Helena Waithera as Lucy
Charlie Karumi as Tony
Tracy Mugo 
Justin Mirichii
David Gitika
Kirk Fonda
Innocent Njuguna
Chris Kamau
Neville Misati as Patrick

Production
The soap opera is produced by Spielswork Media Ltd. Produced by Dorothy Ghettuba who is also the brain behind productions like Lies that Bind, Sumu la penzi. Directed by actor and director Alan Oyugi together with Aggie Nyagari. Filming took place in Nairobi, Kenya. The show features its ensemble cast of Kenyan renowned actress Lizz Njagah, Brian Ogolla, Mumbi Maina, Sarah Hassan and Angel Waruinge.

Broadcast
Jane and Abel made its debut on Maisha Magic channel on September 4, 2015. It airs on Wednesday to Friday at 10 pm.

Awards and nominations

2016 Africa Magic Viewer's choice Awards

References

External links

2014 Kenyan television series debuts
Kenyan drama television series
English-language television shows
Swahili-language television shows
Kenyan television soap operas
2010s Kenyan television series